Ivan Pasteliy (8 May 1826 – 24 March 1891) was a Ruthenian Greek Catholic hierarch. He was bishop of the Ruthenian Catholic Eparchy of Mukacheve from 1875 to 1891.

Born in Veljatin, Austrian Empire (present day – Slovakia) in 1826, he was ordained a priest on 1 July 1849. He was confirmed as the Bishop by the Holy See on 15 March 1875. He was consecrated to the Episcopate on 18 April 1875. The principal consecrator was Bishop Jozef Gaganec.

He died in Uzhhorod on 24 March 1891.

References 

1826 births
1891 deaths
19th-century Eastern Catholic bishops
Ruthenian Catholic bishops